A Poet's Polemic is a 2003 collection of poetry written by Scottish poet John Burnside. It was published as part of National Poetry Day 2003.

References

2003 books
British poetry collections